John Gibson (born July 14, 1993) is an American professional ice hockey goaltender for the Anaheim Ducks of the National Hockey League (NHL).

Gibson was ranked first among North American goaltenders in both the NHL Central Scouting Bureau's preliminary and midterm rankings for the 2011 NHL Entry Draft.

Playing career

Amateur
On June 24, 2011, Gibson was drafted in the second round, 39th overall, at the 2011 NHL Entry Draft by the Anaheim Ducks. Prior to his selection, while still playing with USA Hockey's National Team Development Program, he committed himself to playing college ice hockey at the University of Michigan, which competes in NCAA's Division I in the Big Ten Conference, for the upcoming 2011–12 season. However, on July 27, he opted out of his agreement with Michigan to instead play major junior ice hockey for the Kitchener Rangers of the Ontario Hockey League (OHL). Gibson, who attended Baldwin High School in Pittsburgh, Pennsylvania, was cut from their hockey team and still went on to make the NHL.

During the following season, 2012–13, Gibson was selected to represent the United States at the 2013 World Junior Ice Hockey Championships. He was the team's primary goaltender throughout the championship, registering a .955 save percentage and a 1.36 goals against average (GAA) in seven games for the eventual gold medal winners. His save percentage led all goaltenders in the tournament and he was named as the tournament's best goaltender. He was also named to the tournament All-Star Team, as well as named the tournament's most valuable player.

Gibson also won a bronze medal at the 2013 IIHF World Championships with Team USA's senior squad, posting a 1.56 GAA and .951 save percentage in the tournament.

Professional
Gibson made his professional debut with the Norfolk Admirals, the American Hockey League (AHL) affiliate of the Anaheim Ducks, on April 19, 2013, playing 40 minutes in relief.

On April 7, 2014, aged 20 years and 297 days, Gibson made his first NHL start for the Ducks following an injury to goaltender Frederik Andersen. Making 18 saves for a shutout, Gibson earned his first NHL win, a 3–0 victory over the Vancouver Canucks. In doing so, Gibson became the youngest NHL goaltender to record a shutout in his NHL debut since the Buffalo Sabres' Daren Puppa (20 years, 223 days) performed the feat in the 1985–86 season. Gibson made his Stanley Cup playoff debut with the Ducks in Game 4 of the Western Conference Semifinal against the Los Angeles Kings. He registered a shutout on 28 shots and was named first star of the game on May 10, 2014. Jonas Hiller, whom Gibson started over, was the last goaltender prior to Gibson to record a shutout in his Stanley Cup playoff debut. The Ducks would win Game 5 at home 4–3 but would lose Games 6 and 7 by scores of 2–1 and 6–2, respectively, with Gibson being pulled in Game 7 after allowing 4 goals on 18 shots

With the departure of Jonas Hiller via free agency, the Ducks announced that both Frederik Andersen and John Gibson would compete for the number one starting job for the 2014–15 NHL season. Gibson seemed to have performed well enough in the preseason to start opening night against the Pittsburgh Penguins, his hometown team, in which Gibson stopped 33 of 39 shots en route to a 6–4 loss. With Andersen starting off the season strong, Gibson was sent to Norfolk for a weekend to gain some playing time. Afterwards, he was recalled by the Ducks

Gibson would return and would win 2 starts and lose 1, which included a shutout of the Chicago Blackhawks. Unfortunately, Gibson injured his groin while warming up before a game against the Colorado Avalanche. He was estimated to miss 6–8 weeks, thus giving Andersen total control of the number one job. After coming off injured reserve, Gibson would spend time off with Norfolk. Injuries and illnesses kept Gibson in and out of the lineup, and in 11 games overall, he posted a record of 6–3–2 with a 2.07 goals against averages and a save percentage of .935%

When Andersen went down with an injury and after the team signed Ilya Bryzgalov, Gibson was recalled. When Andersen returned, the two goalies would rotate in and out of the crease with Gibson at one point being considered as the starter down the stretch with Andersen struggling a bit. Overall, Gibson would post up a record of 13–8 with a 2.60 goals against average and a save percentage of .914%. He did not see a single minute of play during the Ducks postseason run, in which they fell to the eventual Stanley Cup Champions, Chicago Blackhawks in seven games

With the off-season acquisition of Anton Khudobin, rumors sparked of Gibson being traded elsewhere, which was promptly put down by Ducks general manager Bob Murray. On September 21, the Ducks announced that they've signed Gibson to a three-year contract extension, worth reportedly $6.9 million. He also began the 2015–16 season with the new AHL club San Diego Gulls. When Andersen had the flu, Gibson was recalled on November 24 and started when the Flames met the Ducks in which the Ducks won 5–3. Gibson started for the next 9 games posting a 4–4–1 record. On January 6, 2016, it was announced that Gibson was selected to his first All-Star Game.

On August 4, 2018, the Ducks re-signed Gibson to an eight-year, $51.2 million contract extension worth $6.4 million annually.

On February 13, 2019, Gibson was placed on injured reserve by the Ducks, due to head, back, and neck injuries obtained from a collision with teammate Jaycob Megna.

International play

Gibson represented Team North America at the 2016 World Cup of Hockey.

Playing style
Like most modern goaltenders, Gibson plays the style of goaltending known as "butterfly style" that first came into play during the 1960s with Tony Esposito, but popularized later by Patrick Roy. Gibson possesses great reflexes and agility, which allows him to often perform saves that are considered difficult to make. Gibson is known for his calm and collective style of play in net, and exceptional ability to read the surrounding play.

Career statistics

Regular season and playoffs

International

Awards and honors

References

External links
 

1993 births
Living people
American men's ice hockey goaltenders
Anaheim Ducks draft picks
Anaheim Ducks players
Ice hockey people from Pittsburgh
Kitchener Rangers players
National Hockey League All-Stars
Norfolk Admirals players
San Diego Gulls (AHL) players
USA Hockey National Team Development Program players
William M. Jennings Trophy winners